Nether Winchendon or Lower Winchendon is a village and civil parish in the Aylesbury Vale district of Buckinghamshire, England.

The toponym "Winchendon" is derived from the Old English for "hill at a bend". The Domesday Book of 1086 records Winchendon as Wincandone.

Nether Winchendon House
Nether Winchendon House, a manor house in Nether Winchendon, built on the site of an Augustinian priory that was a daughter house of Notley Abbey in Long Crendon. Jasper Tudor, Duke of Bedford bought and largely remodelled the priory. The house and gardens are now open to the public and the house is noted for its interior. Nether Winchendon House also hosts weddings.

Nether Winchendon in films and television
Nether Winchendon has been a frequent setting for television and film production, including two Midsomer Murders episodes (as different houses); Lady Pat's house in Forever Green and the BBC series Chef! starring Lenny Henry. St Nicholas' parish church was the setting for a baptism scene in the film Bridget Jones: The Edge of Reason, but can be seen only in the deleted scenes section of the DVD.

Notable residents
Sir Francis Bernard, 1st Baronet - as governor of the provinces of New Jersey and Massachusetts Bay, his uncompromising policies were instrumental in the events leading to the American Revolution.

References

 3. www.netherwinchendon.co.uk

Further reading

External links
 www.netherwinchendon.com

Civil parishes in Buckinghamshire
Villages in Buckinghamshire